The Gold Coast is a lakefront neighborhood of the city of Lakewood, Ohio, United States.  Visible from Downtown Cleveland, the Gold Coast consists of many highrise condo and apartment towers directly along the coasts of Lake Erie. The Gold Coast runs specifically along Edgewater Drive and Lake Avenue. It is bordered on the west by Gold Coast Lane and on the east along W. 117th St. Some consider Clifton Boulevard also to be a part of the Gold Coast. The majority of the neighborhood revolves around dense low-rise residential complexes on the southern side with the newer and taller buildings on the northern side.

Overview 
Winton Place is Lakewood's tallest building with approx. 30 floors, standing in at 264 feet.
The Carlyle (180 feet)
The Meridian (161 feet)
The Waterford (154 feet)
Marine Towers West (154 feet) and Marine Towers East (146 feet) are situated parallel to each other.
The Imperial House
The Envoy
Twelve Thousand Edgewater
The Shoreham Apartments
Edgewater Towers
Lake House Condominiums
The Berkshire Condominiums
Lake Shore Towers was built in 1926 and is amongst the first highrises built in the city of Lakewood. The tower has a grand ballroom, open courtyard, and once housed 3 restaurants which has since become the home of an architectural firm.

Other 
The Gold Coast is mostly residential, however, several hotels and a large number of retail shops (coffeehouses, restaurants, shops, and delis) are on the outskirts of the neighborhood, particularly along Clifton Boulevard and W. 117th St, which is the borderline of Cleveland's Edgewater neighborhood.

Future development 
While the majority of the Gold Coast is fully developed and has been since the 1970s, several plans are under discussion to enhance the future of Lakewood.
The re-development of W. 117th Street in its entirety has long been a wish for both the city of Cleveland and Lakewood. In early 2007, the both cities announced a partnership to work towards improving the overall quality of life on both sides of the street (Cleveland borders the eastern side and Lakewood borders the western side).
The re-construction of the W. 117th Street/Clifton Boulevard intersection has been proposed. New streetscapes, enhanced crosswalks, and improved usage of the northwestern corner of the intersection are some of the issues being discussed.
In 2008, Clifton Boulevard in its entirety was to be re-built into a true boulevard to once again be graced with a median full of young trees. Included in the masterplan is a major reworking of the streetscape and RTA bus access, which would directly impact thousands of Gold Coast residents.

References 

Neighborhoods in Ohio
Lakewood, Ohio
Geography of Cuyahoga County, Ohio